Somatic effort refers to the total investments of an organism in its own development, differentiation, and maintenance which consequently increases its reproductive potential.

References

Behavioral ecology
Reproduction